Flora Anne Selina Montgomery (born 4 January 1974) is a Northern Irish actress.

Early life and family
Montgomery was born at her family's ancestral home in Greyabbey, County Down, the daughter of William Howard Clive Montgomery, OBE, of Rosemount House and of Greyabbey, and his second wife, Daphne Bridgeman. Her maternal grandfather was Geoffrey Bridgeman. She is a descendant of the 1st Viscount Montgomery. She was educated at Rockport School, County Down, and Downe House School, Berkshire. She then studied drama at The Gaiety School of Acting in Dublin, Ireland. She graduated in 1994.

Career
She won the Irish Times Best Actress Award for her role as the lead in Strindberg's Miss Julie. Other roles include Yelena in Chekov's Uncle Vanya, Ophelia in Hamlet and Katherina in The Taming of The Shrew. She has worked with contemporary playwrights such as Neil LaBute who directed her in Bash . She performed in the world premiere of The Reckoning, a two-hander with Jonathan Pryce, and also in the award winning Dinner, both in the West End. Flora has also recorded numerous radio plays, most recently Frederic Raphael's The Glittering Prizes.

In 2003, she was named as one of European film's Shooting Stars by European Film Promotion. Her notable TV appearances include The Bill as Emma, Urban Gothic, Pulling Moves and Midsomer Murders. She also acted in the 2001 film The Discovery of Heaven and in 2006 in Basic Instinct 2.

Montgomery also appeared in an episode of the medical series "Body Story 2" in 2001. In 2012 she had a role in the pilot episode of ITV's Endeavour.

Filmography

 The Governor (1 episode, "#1.5", 1995) .... Susan Fisher
 The Perfect Blue (1997) .... Film Student #2
 Bugs (1 episode, "Renegades", 1997) .... Joanne
 The Tale of Sweeney Todd (TV movie) (1997) .... Young Woman in Waxworks
 Heat of the Sun (TV mini-series) (1 episode, "The Sport of Kings", 1998) .... Dorothy Michaeljohn
 The Bill (4 episodes, "Too Many Cooks", "Gentle Touch: Part 1", "Gentle Touch: Part 2" and "Gentle Touch: Part 3", 1998-2000) .... Carol Chambers / Emma Roberts
 Mosley (4 episodes, "Young Man in a Hurry", "Rules of the Game", "Breaking the Mould" and "Beyond the Pale", 1998) .... Baba/Lady Alexandra Metcalfe
 A Certain Justice (3 episodes, 1998) .... Octavia Aldridge
 Wuthering Heights (1998) .... Isabella Linton
 Agatha Christie's Poirot (1 episode, "The Murder of Roger Ackroyd", 2000) .... Flora Ackroyd
 Metropolis (2000) .... Sophie Hamilton
 Urban Gothic (1 episode, "Turn On", 2000) .... Jane
 When Brendan Met Trudy (2000) .... Trudy
 Monarch of the Glen (1 episode, "#2.4", 2001) .... Tanya Conway
 An Unsuitable Job for a Woman (1 episode, "Playing God", 2001) .... Laura Fergusson
 The Discovery of Heaven (2001) .... Ada
 Body Story 2 (TV series documentary) (1 episode, "Allergy", 2001) .... Phoebe
 The Last (short) (2002) .... Kitty Rose
 Kelly (1 episode, "7 March 2003", 2003) .... Herself 
 Benedict Arnold: A Question of Honor (TV movie) (2003) .... Peggy Shippen
 Goldfish Memory (2003) .... Angie
 Friday Night In (short) (2003) .... Cheryl
 Ultimate Force (1 episode, "Wannabes", 2003) .... Suzi Brown
 Hans Christian Andersen: My Life as a Fairytale (TV movie) (2003) .... Jenny Lind
 Pulling Moves (4 episodes, "Two Weddings and a Break In", "The Pirate and the Choirboys", "The Grandfather Clock" and "All Day Long", 2004) .... Carol
 Murdoch Mysteries (3 episodes, "Except the Dying", "Poor Tom Is Cold" and "Under the Dragon's Tail", 2004) .... Ettie Weston
 Man to Man (2005) .... Abigail McBride
 Murphy's Law (1 episode, "The Goodbye Look", 2005) .... Laura
 Basic Instinct 2 (2006) .... Michelle Broadwin
 Rabbit Fever (2006) ..... Georgia
 After... (2006) .... Addy
 Midsomer Murders (1 episode, "King's Crystal", 2007) .... Sophie Baxter
 Speed Dating (2007) .... Jennifer
 Anner House (TV movie) (2007) .... Ruth Maguire
 The Daisy Chain (2008) .... Orla Gannon
 The Fabulous Food Adventure (unknown episode, 2008) .... Herself
 6th Irish Film & Television Awards (2009) .... Herself - Award Presenter
 The Search (short) (2009) .... Laura
 Father & Son (4 episodes, "#1.1", "#1.2", "#1.3" and "#1.4", 2009) .... Anna/Anna Crowman
 The Waiting Room (short) (2011) .... Anna / Nurse (completed)
 Endeavour (2012) .... Rosalind Stromming
 The Crown (Season 5, 2022) .... Norma Major

Personal life
On 30 August 2014 Montgomery married Søren Jessen, a Danish restaurateur, at Greyabbey on the Montgomery estate in Northern Ireland. Guests included the actor Orlando Bloom, Colin Floatsby, Chenille Gizzard, Barry Plumb, Richard Madeley, and Nadine Dorries, together with Crown Prince Frederik and Crown Princess Mary of Denmark.

References

External links
 
 Profile, thepeerage.com; retrieved 17 November 2014.

1974 births
20th-century actresses from Northern Ireland
21st-century actresses from Northern Ireland
Film actresses from Northern Ireland
People educated at Rockport School
Living people
People from County Down